Marcel Granollers and Gerard Granollers were the defending men's doubles tennis champions in the  tournament, but decided not to participate.

First seeds Michail Elgin and Alexandre Kudryavtsev won this event. They were supposed to play Illya Marchenko and Denys Molchanov; however the Ukrainian pair withdrew due to Marchenko's left knee injury.

Seeds

  Michail Elgin /  Alexandre Kudryavtsev (champion)
  Sergei Bubka /  Adrián Menéndez (semifinals)
  Ilya Belyaev /  Denis Matsukevich (first round)
  Guillermo Alcaide /  Ivo Klec (quarterfinals)

Draw

Draw

References
 Main Draw

Doubles
2011